The Pacific Coast Railway Company Grain Warehouse is a warehouse building located at 65 Higuera St. in San Luis Obispo, California. The warehouse is the only surviving building from the Pacific Coast Railway's headquarters as well as the only extant grain storage building in San Luis Obispo. The date of the building's construction is uncertain; city records state that it was built in 1885, but it may have been rebuilt in 1892–93 after a fire. The wood frame building has corrugated iron paneling on its walls and roof, a typical design for contemporary storage buildings. The Pacific Coast Railway used the warehouse from its construction until the railway folded in 1942; the warehouse held grain grown in the region, which was at the time a major producer of grain and beans.

The warehouse was added to the National Register of Historic Places on June 23, 1988.

See also 
 City of San Luis Obispo Historic Resources

References

External links

 Grain Handling Facilities, Subchapter 7. General Industry Safety Orders, Group 16. Control of Hazardous Substances, Article 109. Hazardous Substances and Processes in California

Buildings and structures in San Luis Obispo, California
Grain production
Commercial buildings on the National Register of Historic Places in California
National Register of Historic Places in San Luis Obispo County, California
Warehouses on the National Register of Historic Places
Grain industry of the United States